
Joseph-Alphonse-Paul Cadotte was a professor of mathematics, industrial engineering, industrial design  at the École Polytechnique de Montréal, where he had achieved distinctions as a student.
Paul Cadotte also served as an Education Officer with the Royal Canadian Air Force. and authored several textbooks in applied industrial algebra and calculus.

Life
He was born in Montreal on December 12, 1897. He was the son of Alfred Cadotte, merchant-tailor, and Dorilda Coutu, his wife, daughter of A. Coutu, of Saint-Gabriel de Brandon.

Paul Cadotte attended primary school at the Jardin de l'Enfance, and took science courses at the Collège Mont-Saint-Louis :fr:Collège Mont-Saint-Louis, a private secondary school.  Paul Cadotte attended l'École Polytechnique de Montréal for two years before finishing his studies at the École Technique, where he distinguished himself by completing in only one year, a complete course on industrial engineering where the majority of his work was published in the school's academic journal (les annales de l'École), and by winning the gold medal from the provincial government bestowed upon the most deserving student. Paul Cadotte graduated with high distinction in 1919.

During the same year, he was appointed regular professor in mathematics, industrial engineering and industrial design at the École Technique.  Although relatively young, he was nonetheless considered an authority on technical education.

He was absorbed in his work and devoted almost exclusively to the education of his many students. He was considered an attractive man of athletic build and was adept in several sports - indoor and outdoor.  He most excelled in fitness, tennis, swimming and billiards.  He was a key player in developing and promoting the game of tennis among French-Canadians.  As a lifetime member of the l'Association Athlétique National , he endeavoured greatly in making the Association an important institution in Canada.

On June 10, 1925, Paul Cadotte married Albertine Dufresne, daughter of F.-X. Dufresne from Montreal.  Together they had one son, Pierre M. Cadotte.  They resided at 4918 rue Adam in Montreal.

Later in life, he married Seraphine Benoit of Grand Bay, Dominica where they met.  He later moved to Charlottetown, Prince Edward Island, Canada  with Seraphine, where he resided until his death.  They had one son.

Academic Contributions and Works

Astute in mathematics, Paul Cadotte, represented École Technique at the First Canadian Mathematical Congress in 1945

Paul Cadotte also presented a paper to the Royal Commission on Education (also known as the Parent Commission) on behalf of the l'école polytechnique de Montréal

Paul Cadotte was the author of several mathematic textbooks including:

"Initiation au calcul différentiel et intégral avec applications industrielles. Exercices"
J.-A.-Paul(Jean-Alphonse)Cadotte. Réimpr. juil. 1961 -- Montréal
J.-A.(Jean-Alphonse)-Paul Cadotte. 1949. Montréal.
Théorie / par J.-A. (Jean-Alphonse)-Paul Cadotte. Réimpr. 1959 -- Montréal
Théorie / par J.-A.(Jean-Alphonse)-Paul Cadotte. Réimpr. 1961 -- Montréal
Théorie / par J.-A. (Jean-Alphonse) -Paul Cadotte. 1949-- Montréal.

"Algèbre appliquée à l'industrie"
tome I / J.-A. (Jean-Alphonse)-Paul Cadotte. 1950 -- Montréal.
Algèbre appliquée à l'industrie : tome II / J.-A. (Jean-Alphonse) -Paul Cadotte. 1946-1949. -- Montréal.

References

Bibliography
Raphaël OUIMET, éd., Biographies canadiennes françaises, treizième édition, Montréal, 1937, 461p., p. 229. / Raphael OUIMET, ed., Biographies of French Canadians, thirteenth edition, Montreal, 1937, 461p., P. 229.

External links
  Biography Joseph-Alphonse-Paul Cadotte - The Quebec History Encyclopedia 
  L'École Polytechnique de Montréal main page
 List of Works - Library and Archives Canada 
 List of Works - University of Laval Library 
  History of L'Association athlétique d'amateurs nationale 
  Papers and briefs filed at the hearings of the Royal Commission of Education (Parent Commission) 

1897 births
1979 deaths